Hormaechea is a surname. Notable people with the surname include:

Francisco de Lersundi y Hormaechea (1817–1874), Spanish noble and politician
Juan Hormaechea (1939–2020), Spanish politician